Storm Bird (19 April 1978 – 3 December 2004) was a Canadian-bred, Irish-trained  Thoroughbred racehorse and sire. He was the outstanding European two-year-old of 1980, when he was unbeaten in five races, including the Anglesey Stakes, National Stakes and Dewhurst Stakes. His subsequent career was disrupted by injury and illness, and he was well beaten in his only race of 1981. He was then retired to stud, where he became a successful breeding stallion.

Background
Storm Bird was a bay horse with a white star and snip and two white socks bred in Canada by Windfields Farm. He was one of many important winners sired by Northern Dancer, who won the Kentucky Derby in 1964 before becoming one of the most successful breeding stallions in Thoroughbred history. His dam, South Ocean, had previously produced Northernette (also sired by Northern Dancer), the champion filly of her generation in Canada at two and three years of age. The colt was sent to race in Europe and was trained by Vincent O'Brien at Ballydoyle, County Tipperary.

Racing career
On his racecourse debut, Storm Bird started 2/5 favourite for a 19-runner maiden race over six furlongs at the Curragh in July. He was bumped by one of his opponents at the start, but recovered to win by six lengths. The colt was then moved up in class for the Group Three Anglesey Stakes at the same course in August. He took the lead two furlongs from the finish, but appeared to idle in front and won by only half a length from Prince Echo. The form of the race was boosted when Prince Echo won the Champagne Stakes at Doncaster in September. Two weeks after his win in the Anglesey Stakes, Storm Bird moved up in distance to contest the seven-furlong National Stakes, Ireland's most valuable race for two-year-olds. Ridden by Tommy Murphy, he started the 2/5 favourite and won in emphatic style, taking the lead two furlongs from the finish and beating Master Thatch by four lengths.

In the Larkspur Stakes at Leopardstown Racecourse in September, Storm Bird, ridden by Steve Cauthen, was required to concede weight to his five opponents, but won easily, beating Band Practice by four length despite being eased down in the closing stages. On his final appearance of the season, Storm Bird was sent to contest Britain's most prestigious two-year-old race, the Dewhurst Stakes over seven furlongs at Newmarket Racecourse. He was opposed by a strong field, including Miswaki, Kirtling (Chesham Stakes) and To-Agori-Mou. Ridden by Pat Eddery, he started the 4/5 favourite in a race run in cold, wet, and windy conditions. Storm Bird took the lead after two furlongs, and when he accelerated in the final quarter mile, only To-Agori-Mou was able to go with him. The two colts drew clear of the field, and after a protracted struggle, Storm Bird prevailed by half a length.

Storm Bird's three-year-old "career" became a complete disaster for his supporters. In early spring, he was attacked in his stable by a former stable lad, who cut off the hair from the horse's mane and tail. The colt appeared to be otherwise unharmed, but then sustained an injury to his hind leg and then developed a respiratory infection which ruled him out of the 2000 Guineas and Derby. It was then announced that the horse would be aimed at the Prix de l'Arc de Triomphe at Longchamp Racecourse in October, and he was heavily backed for the race after reports that he had easily beaten Kings Lake in a training gallop at Ballydoyle. He finally reappeared in the Prix du Prince d'Orange at Longchamp in September, but ran very poorly to finish seventh of the 9 runners behind Vayrann.

Assessment
In 1980, Storm Bird was the highest-rated European two-year-old on the official International Classification, one pound ahead of To-Agori-Mou. The independent Timeform organisation rated him at 134. In their book A Century of Champions, John Randall and Tony Morris rated Storm Bird the 27th best two-year-old trained in Britain or Ireland in the 20th century.

Stud record
Retired to stand at stud at Ashford Stud in Versailles, Kentucky,  Storm Bird sired 63 stakes winners, including Summer Squall, Storm Cat, Balanchine, Indian Skimmer and Bluebird. Also, Storm Bird was the broodmare sire of winners of more than 100 stakes races, including Kentucky Derby winner Thunder Gulch and the lightning-fast gelding Commentator.

Pensioned from stud duties in 1999, Storm Bird had to be euthanized on 3 December 3 2004, after  suffering from colic.

Pedigree

References

Thoroughbred family 4-j
1978 racehorse births
2004 racehorse deaths
Racehorses bred in Ontario
Racehorses trained in Ireland